Jack Milsom (22 February 1907 – 1977) was an English footballer who played in The Football League for Bolton Wanderers, Manchester City and Rochdale. He was born in Bedminster, England.

References

1907 births
1977 deaths
Footballers from Bristol
Association football forwards
English footballers
Exeter City F.C. players
Bristol Rovers F.C. players
Kettering Town F.C. players
Rochdale A.F.C. players
Bolton Wanderers F.C. players
Manchester City F.C. players
English Football League players